Chaos Break -Episode from "Chaos Heat"- is a third-person shooter survival horror brawler game that was released for the Sony PlayStation in 2000.

Chaos Break is the sequel to the 1998 arcade game Chaos Heat.

Plot

Chaos Break is essentially a third-person beat 'em up shooter game just like its arcade predecessor, with echoes of survival horror action and areas with similarities to games such as Dino Crisis and Half-Life. Set in an abandoned, contaminated biochemical laboratory; Fluxus Biomateril Industries Lab 7, a civilian research facility set on an isolated island. The two playable characters; Mitsuki and Rick, who are D.E.F agents, an investigatory and cleansing task force that are sent out to check the facility, and retrieve the research data. Find the cause of an 'anomalous thermal reaction and find out what happened to the missing D.E.F agent that HQ lost contact with two days ago.

Progress through the game is made by defeating the enemies, which in this case are alien parasitic lifeforms, mutated staff members and the laboratory's robotic security drones, collect level-clearance pass cards and data which are CD discs. Looting the corpses and lockers for health, ammo and key items to progress through the facility and with a in-game 24 hour clock that affect some of the doors' access window. An element of survival horror is introduced at the computer terminals, where the player can save their game and read the E-Mails that explain some of the back-story of those who worked at the civilian research facility before the outbreak.

Gameplay 
Chaos Break is a third person, survival horror game.

References

2000 video games
Eon Digital Entertainment games
2000s horror video games
PlayStation (console) games
PlayStation (console)-only games
Single-player video games
Taito games
Third-person shooters
Video games developed in Japan
Video games set on islands